Sofie Podlipská, née Rottová (15 May 1833 in Prague – 17 December 1897 in Prague) was a Czech writer and the sister of Karolina Světlá. Sofie Podlipská mostly wrote historical novels, juvenile works, and feminist literature. She also had an interest in Theosophy and helped found the "American Ladies' Club." The name had no geographical meaning instead the word "American" was to designate it as modern and for progress. Her work emphasized motherhood and morality.

References 

1833 births
1897 deaths
Writers from Prague
People from the Kingdom of Bohemia
Czech women writers
Czech historical novelists
Czech translators
French–Czech translators
Feminist writers
Women historical novelists
Czech-language writers
19th-century women writers
19th-century translators
Burials at Olšany Cemetery